Bound By Honor (2019) was a two night, two city professional wrestling event produced by Ring of Honor (ROH), that took place on February 9, 2019 at RP Funding Arena in Lakeland, Florida (tapings for ROH's flagship program Ring of Honor Wrestling) and on February 10, 2019 at the Watsco Center in Coral Gables, Florida (live event).

Storylines
Bound By Honor (2019) featured professional wrestling matches, involving different wrestlers from pre-existing scripted feuds, plots, and storylines that played out on ROH's television programs. Wrestlers portrayed villains or heroes as they followed a series of events that built tension and culminated in a wrestling match or series of matches.

Matches

Night 1 - Lakeland, FL (TV Tapings)

Night 2 - Coral Gables, FL

See also
2019 in professional wrestling

References

Ring of Honor shows
2019 in professional wrestling
2019 in professional wrestling in Florida
Events in Lakeland, Florida
Events in Coral Gables, Florida
Professional wrestling in Florida
February 2019 events in the United States
Sports in Coral Gables, Florida